Adiba Jaigirdar is a Bangladeshi-Irish writer. Her debut novel, The Henna Wars, is listed as one of Time magazine's 100 Best YA Books of All Time, alongside novels such as Little Women, Lord of the Flies, and The Catcher in the Rye.

Personal life 
Jaigirdar was born in Dhaka, Bangladesh, then alternated between living in Saudi Arabia and Bangladesh as a child. At age ten, she and her family immigrated to Tullamore, Ireland; she has lived in the Dublin region ever since.

Throughout much of her life, she has been one of the few people of color in a room, an experience which has shaped her writing.

Jaigirdar identifies as a queer Muslim woman of color. Like characters from her novel Hani and Ishu's Guide to Fake Dating, Jaigirdar "has been told that parts of her identity cancel out others and couldn't exist in the same person." Her writing is now inspired by her history and with hopes that young Muslim people of color can embrace their queer identities.

Education 
After immigrating to Ireland at age 10, Jaigirdar attended an all-girls Catholic school.

Jaigirdar has a Bachelor of Arts in English and History from the University of Kent, as well as a Master of Arts in Postcolonial Studies from University College Dublin.

Career 
Aside from writing young adult novels, Jaigirdar has been a writer for Book Riot. She also teaches English as a foreign language to recent immigrants to Ireland.

Jaigirdar, choosing to write about people like herself, has stated, "My very existence is political, so the things that I write will also be seen as inherently political." Like characters from her novel Hani and Ishu's Guide to Fake Dating, Jaigirdar "has been told that parts of her identity cancel out others and couldn't exist in the same person." Her writing is now inspired by her history and with hopes that young people of color can embrace their queer identities.

Selected texts

The Henna Wars (2020) 

The Henna Wars was published May 12, 2020 in the United States and October 2021 in the United Kingdom. The book follows Nishat, a Bangladeshi teenager who comes out as a lesbian while in high school.

The novel deals with a number of themes, including racism, homophobia, Islamophobia, and coming-of-age. The intersection between Nishat's cultural identity and her sexual identity is a central theme of the novel. Lana Barnes of Shelf Awareness described Nishat's struggle as "the dichotomy of wanting to break from the constraints of tradition while still maintaining strong ties to culture and beliefs."

The Henna Wars has received generally positive reviews, including starred reviews from Kirkus Reviews and Shelf Awareness. Time included The Henna Wars on their list of the 100 Best Young Adult Books of All Time, alongside novels such as Little Women, Lord of the Flies, and The Catcher in the Rye. It was listed as one of the best young adult books of 2020 and 2021 by Teen Vogue, American Library Association, The Irish Times, Autostraddle and NPR.

Publications 

 The Henna Wars (2020)
 Hani and Ishu's Guide to Fake Dating (2021)
 A Million to One (2022)
 Donut Fall In Love (2023)
 Untitled (2024)

Anthology contributions 

 200 CCS: Year One (2017)
 Momentum (2018)
 Keep Faith (2019)
 Allies: Real Talk About Showing Up, Screwing Up, And Trying Again, edited by Dana Alison Levy (2021)

References

External links 

 

Living people
Alumni of the University of Kent
Alumni of University College Dublin
Writers from Dhaka
Irish Muslims
Bangladeshi LGBT people
21st-century Irish writers
Irish lesbian writers
Year of birth missing (living people)